Rinkeby Swedish is any of a number of varieties of Swedish spoken mainly in urban districts with a high proportion of immigrant residents which emerged as a linguistic phenomenon in the 1980s. Rinkeby in Stockholm is one such suburb, but the term Rinkeby Swedish may sometimes be used for similar varieties in other Swedish cities as well. A similar term is Rosengårdssvenska ("Rosengård Swedish") after the district Rosengård in Malmö. The one magazine in Sweden published in these varieties, Gringo, proposes 'miljonsvenska' ("Million Swedish") based on the Million Programme.

Different varieties of Rinkeby Swedish exist which are based on the regional dialects, especially in the major urban centers of Stockholm (Svealand dialects), Malmö (Scanian) and Gothenburg (western Götaland dialects).

Classification
Opinions among linguists differ on whether to regard Rinkeby Swedish as a sociolect, dialect, ethnolect, or maybe a "multiethnolect". Since the number of influencing languages involved is rather large, and extremely few speakers are likely to be fluent in more than a few of these, the definition of pidgin language may appear more accurate than that of mixed language. The varieties may also be characterized as a register for informal communication between peers, since the speakers often use them only in specific social contexts and switch to other varieties where appropriate.

Use
Professor Ulla-Britt Kotsinas, a scholar frequently cited on Rinkeby Swedish, argues that these varieties primarily are spoken by teenagers from suburbs where immigrants and immigrant descendants are concentrated, and can be interpreted as expressions of youth culture: The language is a marker of belonging to a certain subculture and at the same time opposition to a perceived mainstream non-immigrant culture that seems not to value the immigrant descendants. 

Rinkeby Swedish and similar varieties thus express belonging to the rather large group of youths with roots in other countries that have grown up in immigrant neighborhoods in a post-industrial society and with a disproportionately high unemployment rate for youths with immigrant background. Except for the fact that the linguistic distance is greater, Kotsinas sees in principle no difference from the suburban and urban working class varieties that followed industrial revolution and urbanization a century ago.

Many words from Rinkeby Swedish have now been incorporated into all kinds of other Swedish youth slang and are used by many young people without immigrant heritage as a marker of group solidarity and identity.

Distinctive traits
Variants of Rinkeby Swedish are reported from suburbs of Stockholm, Uppsala,  Malmö, and Gothenburg with a predominantly immigrant population. These variants tend to be based on the local town accents, or on the variety of Standard Swedish taught in school. These varieties can be described as having a somewhat simplified version of the Swedish grammar and a richness of loanwords from the languages of the countries the speakers' parents or grandparents originated in: mainly Turkish, with traces of Kurdish, Arabic, Greek, Persian, Serbo-Croatian, Syriac, and to some extent Latin American Spanish. Many English words and some English grammar are also used, due to a fairly widespread identification with African Americans and the appreciation of rap and hip hop music and culture.

Especially among younger speakers, the different varieties show a considerable variation in vocabulary and to some extent in grammar and syntax. However, they all share some grammatical similarities, such as discarding the Verb-second word order of Standard Swedish, instead using subject–verb–object word order after an adverb or adverbial phrase (as in English, compare Idag jag tog bussen ("Today I took the bus") to Standard Swedish Idag tog jag bussen ("Today took I the bus").Sample vocabulary

Literary use
Novels written partially or completely in Rinkeby Swedish includeTill vår ära by Alejandro Leiva Wenger; ("To our honour")Ett öga rött by Jonas Hassen Khemiri; ("One eye red")Shoo Bre by Douglas FoleyKalla det vad fan du vill'' by Marjaneh Bakhtiari. ("Call it whatever the hell you want")

See also
 Multicultural London English
 Swedish hip hop
 Post-war Sweden
 Swedish dialects
 Kebabnorsk
 Perkerdansk
 Ebonics

References

Further reading

External links
Language and language use among young people in  multilingual urban settings- a research project at Gothenburg University 

Swedish dialects
Swedish hip hop